MV Gloucester (1941) was a cargo vessel operated by the New Zealand Shipping Company from 1941 to 1966. It was mainly intended to transport fruit from New Zealand to the United Kingdom.

War service

The ship was included in several of the North Atlantic convoys between America, Canada and Great Britain.

Convoy HX 161 Departed Halifax on 21 November 1941 and arrived Liverpool on 6 December
Convoy ON 050 Liverpool 24/12/41
Convoy HX 228 NYC 28/02/43
Convoy UC 027 Belfast Lough 23/06/44
Convoy CU 060 NYC 27/02/45
Convoy UC 063B LIVERPOOL 11/04/45

Fate

In 1966 she was sold to Greece and renamed Consulate and scrapped shortly afterwards.

References

1941 ships
Ships built on the River Clyde
Merchant ships of New Zealand